Electronic Evolution Technologies, Inc. (EE Technologies, Inc / EET) is a multi-national electronic manufacturing services (EMS) company headquartered in Reno, Nevada. EET provides full electronic and mechanical box build assembly services and also specializes in circuit board assembly for a variety of markets, including the automotive, medical, military and digital audio/video markets. The company operates a global manufacturing network with operations in the Americas and Mexico, providing services to OEMs (original equipment manufacturers). EET has been recognized as one of the top 20 Contract Manufacturers in the Western United States.

History
EE Technologies, Inc. was incorporated as Meridian Electronics in 1994. By 1999 Meridian Electronics had grown to $28 million a year in revenues and had 20 people. EE Technologies was spun off from Meridian Electronics in March 2000. In October 2000, the company moved into a new facility in South Reno, Nevada with new equipment and a staff of 40 people. In December 2002, the company expanded their facilities by  allowing for improved production efficiencies and capabilities, as well as improved inventory management. Currently, the company employs over 180 people with facilities in the US and Mexico. EE Technologies, Inc recently settled a lawsuit with the Environmental Protection Agency for $80,000.

Operations
EE Technologies, Inc's manufacturing network comprises locations in the Americas and Mexico. The company's services include design and engineering, manufacturing and systems assembly, fulfilment and after-market services.

Empalme, Sonora Mexico, Mexico Facility
In October 2005, EE Technologies, Inc expanded further with the opening of a facility in Empalme, Mexico. The equipment, process, and training in the Mexico facility mirror the operations in Reno, Nevada. Both facilities are ISO/TS 16949:2002 certified.

References

Companies based in Reno, Nevada
Electronics companies of the United States